Sumit Singh (born 10 September 1987) is an Indian cricketer. He made his first-class debut for Services in the 2010–11 Ranji Trophy on 1 November 2010.

References

External links
 

1987 births
Living people
Indian cricketers
Services cricketers
Cricketers from Delhi